Jennie Johnsen (born 3 December 1977 in Skien) is a Norwegian politician for the Liberal Party.

From 1998 to 2001 she was the leader of the Young Liberals of Norway, the youth wing of the Liberal Party. She was a vice leader of the Liberal Party from 2002 to 2004.

In 1995, at only 17 years of age, she was elected to serve in Skien city council. She held a seat in Oslo city council from 2003 to 2007.

She served as a deputy representative to the Norwegian Parliament from Oslo during the term 2005–2009.

References

1977 births
Living people
Liberal Party (Norway) politicians
Deputy members of the Storting
Women members of the Storting
Politicians from Skien